The black lory (Chalcopsitta atra), also known as the rajah lory or red-quilled lory, is a medium-sized, blackish parrot with black bill, dark grey feet and long rounded tail. It has yellow and red under-tail. The sexes are similar.  It is native to West Papua in Indonesia.

The black lory is evaluated as Least Concern on IUCN Red List of Threatened Species. It is listed on Appendix II of CITES.

Description
Its plumage is mostly black with a blue rump. Red markings on face, thighs, and tail vary between the three subspecies. Males and females are similar in external appearance.

Taxonomy
The species was given its formal name by the naturalist Giovanni Antonio Scopoli. Scopoli did not in fact examine any specimens, but used the informal description by the explorer Pierre Sonnerat published in his book Voyage à la Nouvelle-Guinée (1776). The determination was accurate enough for the name to be valid, so Scopoli is credited as the author of this taxon.

Three subspecies of the black lory are recognized:

Chalcopsitta atra (Scopoli, 1786)
 Chalcopsitta atra atra (Scopoli, 1786), native to western Bird's Head Peninsula of the Indonesian province of West Papua, and nearby islands.
 Chalcopsitta atra bernsteini Rosenberg, 1861, on the Indonesian island of Misool.
 Chalcopsitta atra insignis Oustalet, 1878, on eastern Bird's Head Peninsula, nearby islands, and the Onin and Bomberai Peninsulas of West Papua.

References

Cited texts

External links 

 BirdLife Species Factsheet

Chalcopsitta
Birds of West Papua
Birds described in 1786
Taxa named by Giovanni Antonio Scopoli